August C. "Junie" Bartulis, Jr. (December 9, 1927 – January 31, 2011) was an American businessman and politician.

Born in Benld, Illinois, Bartulis went to the Benld public schools. He served in the United States Army shortly after World War II and during the Korean War. He owned the Wayside Garage and Service Station in Benld, Illinois. From 1967 to 1971, Bartulis served as the Macoupin County, Illinois treasurer and was a Republican. Bartulis served in the Illinois House of Representatives and the Illinois State Senate. Bartulis died at Carlinville General Hospital in Carlinville, Illinois.

Notes

External links

1927 births
2011 deaths
People from Macoupin County, Illinois
Businesspeople from Illinois
County officials in Illinois
Republican Party Illinois state senators
Republican Party members of the Illinois House of Representatives
Military personnel from Illinois
20th-century American businesspeople